McPixel 3 is a puzzle video game developed by Mikołaj 'Sos Sosowski' Kamiński and produced by Devolver Digital. It is the sequel to the 2012 game McPixel.

Gameplay 
McPixel 3 is a point and click adventure game centered around the titular pixelated character McPixel the parody of MacGyver, who is tasked with the objective of 'saving the day' by using objects and finding solutions in the environment around them.   

Similar to its prequel, there are 100 timed levels to complete with over 20 microgames, more than 900 gags, and 1,500 interactive items for players to experience.

Development and release 
McPixel 3 was officially announced via Twitter by Devolver Digital on 17 February 2022, with a release date set for 2022.

Although the game is named as the third installment of the series, it is a direct sequel to 2012's McPixel as there is no second numbered title developed by Sos Sosowski. 

The first playable demo of McPixel 3 was a part of Steam Next Fest on 21 February 2022, which featured 10 out of the 100 levels that are offered in the game for players to experience.

The game was released on 14 November 2022.

References

External links 

 Official website
 McPixel 3 Demo

2022 video games
Nintendo Switch games
Parody video games
Point-and-click adventure games
Retro-style video games
Video games about bomb disposal
Video games developed in Poland
Video game sequels
Windows games
Xbox Series X and Series S games